David Manning (sometimes "Dave") was a pseudonym used by a marketing executive around July 2000 to give consistently good reviews for releases from Sony subsidiary Columbia Pictures. Several fictional review quotes attributed to "David Manning" were used in the promotion of medieval action/drama A Knight's Tale (describing Heath Ledger as "this year's hottest new star!") and Rob Schneider's comedy The Animal ("Another winner!"), the latter of which generally received poor reviews by real critics.

Details 
Manning was named after a friend of Matthew Cramer, the Sony marketing executive responsible for the insertions. Manning was credited to The Ridgefield Press, a small weekly newspaper from Ridgefield, Connecticut that actually published film reviews written by the father-and-son team of Mark and Jonathan Schumann. During an investigation into Manning's quotes, Newsweek reporter John Horn discovered that the newspaper had never heard of him. The story emerged in mid-2001, around the same time as an announcement that Sony had used employees posing as moviegoers in television commercials to praise the Mel Gibson film The Patriot. These occurrences, in tandem, raised questions and controversy about ethics in film promotion practices.

On June 10, 2001, on an episode of Le Show, host Harry Shearer conducted an in-studio interview with David Manning. The voice of Manning was provided by a computer voice synthesizer.

On August 3, 2005, Sony made an out-of-court settlement and agreed to refund $5 each to dissatisfied customers who saw Hollow Man, The Animal, The Patriot, A Knight's Tale, or Vertical Limit in American theaters as a result of Manning's reviews.

References

External links 
 David Manning entry from the Museum of Hoaxes
 MetaCritic and RottenTomato rankings for the movies reviewed by Manning
 Rezec v. Sony Pictures Entertainment, Inc., No. 160586 (Cal. App. Jan. 27, 2004)

2000 hoaxes
2000 in American cinema
Nonexistent people used in hoaxes
Hoaxes in the United States
Journalistic hoaxes
Columbia Pictures
21st-century pseudonymous writers
Film advertising material